The Buffalo Bisons were a Major League Baseball team that was based in Buffalo, New York. They played in the National League from 1879 through 1885.  During their time as a Major League team, the Bisons employed five different managers.  The duties of the team manager include team strategy and leadership on and off the field.

Table key

Managers

References

Buffalo Bisons
Buffalo Bisons (NL) managers